Layton Ahac (born Feb 22, 2001) is a Canadian professional ice hockey defenceman currently playing for the Henderson Silver Knights of the American Hockey League (AHL) as a prospect for the Vegas Golden Knights of the National Hockey League (NHL). He previously played junior hockey with the Prince George Spruce Kings of the British Columbia Hockey League (BCHL), as well as NCAA collegiate hockey with the Ohio State Buckeyes.

Playing career

After a short stint with the U18-level Vancouver North West Giants of the BC Hockey Major Midget League (BCEHL), Ahac entered junior hockey with the Prince George Spruce Kings of the British Columbia Hockey League (BCHL). In his two years with Prince George, Ahac was named to the BCHL All-Rookie Team for 2017–18, and the Second All-Star Team for 2018–19, helping the Spruce Kings to a Fred Page Cup championship in 2019.

Ahac was selected 86th overall in the third round of the 2019 NHL Entry Draft by the Vegas Golden Knights. He then played two seasons of collegiate hockey at Ohio State University, whom he had committed to in 2017.

Ahac signed his three-year entry-level contract with Vegas on March 30, 2021, joining their American Hockey League (AHL) affiliate, the Henderson Silver Knights, shortly thereafter.

International play

Ahac appeared for the Canada West team at the 2018 World Junior A Challenge, recording two points in six games.

Career statistics

Regular season and playoffs

International play

Awards and honours

References

External links

2001 births
Living people
Canadian ice hockey defencemen
Henderson Silver Knights players
Ice hockey people from British Columbia
Ohio State Buckeyes men's ice hockey players
Prince George Spruce Kings players
Sportspeople from North Vancouver
Vegas Golden Knights draft picks